Phenacolimax is a genus of air-breathing land snails, terrestrial pulmonate gastropod mollusks in the family Vitrinidae.

Species
The genus Phenacolimax includes the following species:
 Phenacolimax atlantica 
 Phenacolimax blanci (Pollonera, 1884)
 † Phenacolimax crassitesta (Andreae, 1902) 
 † Phenacolimax intermedius (Reuss in Reuss & Meyer, 1849) 
 † Phenacolimax kochi (Andreae, 1884) 
 Phenacolimax locardi (Pollonera, 1884)
 Phenacolimax major (A. Férussac, 1807)
 Phenacolimax stabilei  (Lessona, 1880)
 † Phenacolimax suevica (F. Sandberger, 1872) 
 Synonyms
 Phenacolimax annularis (S. Studer, 1820): synonym of Oligolimax annularis (S. Studer, 1820à)(unaccepted combination)
 Phenacolimax austrasiae A. J. Wagner, 1915: synonym of Phenacolimax major (A. Férussac, 1807) (junior synonym)
 Phenacolimax retyezati A. J. Wagner, 1915: synonym of Semilimacella bonellii reitteri (O. Boettger, 1880) (junior synonym)

References

 Stabile, G. (1859). Description de quelques coquilles nouvelles ou peu connues. Revue et Magasin de Zoologie, 2 (11): 419-433. Paris.
 Bank, R. A. (2017). Classification of the Recent terrestrial Gastropoda of the World. Last update: July 16th, 2017.

 
Vitrinidae
Taxonomy articles created by Polbot